Plamen Krumov may refer to:

Plamen Krumov (footballer born 1975), Bulgarian footballer
Plamen Krumov (footballer born 1985), Bulgarian footballer